Arthur William Saxton (28 August 1874 – 1911) was an English professional footballer who played as a winger for Sunderland.

References

1874 births
1911 deaths
People from Breaston
Footballers from Derbyshire
English footballers
Association football wingers
Long Eaton Rangers F.C. players
Mansfield Town F.C. players
Loughborough F.C. players
Glossop North End A.F.C. players
Stalybridge Rovers F.C. players
Sunderland A.F.C. players
Bedminster F.C. players
Luton Town F.C. players
Northampton Town F.C. players
Nottingham Forest F.C. players
English Football League players